Edward Sanders (born August 17, 1939) is an American poet, singer, activist, author, publisher and longtime member of the rock band the Fugs. He has been called a bridge between the Beat and hippie generations. Sanders is considered to have been active and "present at the counterculture's creation."

Biography
Sanders was born in Kansas City, Missouri. He dropped out of the University of Missouri in 1958 and hitchhiked to New York City's Greenwich Village to attend New York University. He graduated in 1964, with a degree in Greek.

Sanders wrote his first notable poem, "Poem from Jail", on toilet paper in his cell after being jailed for protesting the launch of nuclear submarines armed with nuclear missiles in 1961. In 1962, he founded the avant-garde journal Fuck You/A Magazine of the Arts. Sanders opened the Peace Eye Bookstore at 383 East Tenth Street in what was then the Lower East Side; the store became a gathering place for Bohemians, writers and radicals. On January 1, 1966, police raided Peace Eye Bookstore and charged Sanders with obscenity, charges he fended off with the aid of the ACLU. Notoriety generated by the case led to his appearance on the February 17, 1967 cover of Life Magazine, which proclaimed him "a leader of New York's Other Culture."

In late 1964, Sanders founded the Fugs with Tuli Kupferberg. The band broke up in 1969 and reformed in 1984. On October 21, 1967, on the National Mobilization Committee to End the War in Vietnam's March on the Pentagon, Sanders helped The Fugs and the San Francisco Diggers in an attempt to "exorcise" The Pentagon. In 1968, he signed the "Writers and Editors War Tax Protest" pledge, vowing to refuse tax payments in protest against the Vietnam War.

In 1969, Sanders recorded and released his first solo album for Reprise Records, Sanders' Truck Stop. Reviewing in Christgau's Record Guide: Rock Albums of the Seventies (1981), Robert Christgau wrote: "This is literally a country-rock takeoff—not a parody but a departure. But though I hesitate to criticize a man who is not only a saint and a genius but who says hello to me at the post office, I must point out that the yodeling country twang Sanders developed with the Fugs has never known the difference between parody and departure, which makes some of these songs seem crueller than they're intended to be. Of course, sometimes they're cruel on purpose—like 'The Iliad,' a saga of good old queer-bashing with a Greek-to-me intro. And sometimes, like 'Jimmy Joe, the Hippybilly Boy,' they're—snurfle—lyrical and sad."

In 1971, Sanders wrote The Family, a profile of the events leading up to the Tate-LaBianca murders. He attended the Manson group's murder trial, and spent time at their residence at the Spahn Movie Ranch. There have been two updated editions of The Family, the most recent in 2002. The Process Church of the Final Judgement sued Sanders's U.S. publisher for defamation over a chapter linking them with Manson's activities. The case was settled by the publisher, who removed the disputed chapter from future editions. The Process Church then sued Sanders's British publisher, but lost the suit and were forced to pay the defendant's legal fees.

Sanders is the founder of the Investigative Poetry movement. His 1976 manifesto Investigative Poetry, published by Lawrence Ferlinghetti's City Lights Books, influenced investigative writing and poetry during the ensuing decades. In the 1990s, Sanders began utilizing the principles of Investigative Poetry to create a series of book-length poems on literary figures and American History. Among these works are Chekhov, 1968: A History in Verse, and The Poetry and Life of Allen Ginsberg. In 1998, Sanders began work on a 9-volume America, A History in Verse. The first five volumes, tracing the history of the 20th century, were published in a CD format with over 2,000 pages in length.

Sanders received a Guggenheim Fellowship in poetry in 1983, and a National Endowment for the Arts Fellowship in poetry in 1987. His Thirsting for Peace in a Raging Century, Selected Poems 1961–1985 won an American Book Award in 1988. He was chosen to deliver the Charles Olson Memorial Lectures at SUNY Buffalo in 1983. In 1997, he received a Writers Community residency sponsored by the YMCA National Writer's Voice through the Lila Wallace Reader's Digest Fund.

In 1997, he was awarded a grant from the Foundation for Contemporary Arts Grants to Artists Award. In 2000 and 2003, he was Writer-in-Residence at the New York State Writers Institute in Albany, New York.

Sanders lives in Woodstock, New York, where he publishes the online Woodstock Journal with his wife of over 47 years, writer and painter Miriam R. Sanders. He also invents musical instruments, including the Talking Tie, the microtonal Microlyre, and the Lisa Lyre, a musical contraption involving light-activated switches and a reproduction of Da Vinci's Mona Lisa.

Selected bibliography
Fuck You: A Magazine of the Arts, New York: Peace Eye Bookstore (1962-1965)
Poem from Jail, San Francisco: City Lights Books, 1963
Peace Eye (1965)
Shards of God (1970)
The Family: The Story of Charles Manson's Dune Buggy Attack Battalion (1971, New Edition, 1990)
Egyptian Hieroglyphics (1973)
Tales of Beatnik Glory, Volume 1 (1975)
Investigative Poetry (1976)
20,000 A.D. (1976)
Fame & Love in New York (1980)
The Z-D Generation (1981)
The Cutting Prow (1983)
Hymn to Maple Syrup & Other Poems (1985)
Thirsting for Peace in a Raging Century: Selected Poems 1961–1985 (1987)
Poems for Robin (1987)
Tales of Beatnik Glory, Volumes 1 & 2 (1990) New York: Citadel Underground. 
Hymn to the Rebel Cafe (1993)
Chekhov (1995)
1968: A History in Verse (1997)
America, A History in Verse, Vol. 1 (1900–1939) (2000)
The Poetry and Life of Allen Ginsberg, The Overlook Press (2000)
America, A History in Verse, Vol. 2 (1940–1961) (2001)
America, A History in Verse, Vol. 3 (1962–1970) (2004)
"Poems for New Orleans" (2004)
"Edward Sanders | Glyphs" The Brother in Elysium (2011)

"A Book of Glyphs (trade edition) Granary Books (2014)
A Book of Glyphs  (limited edition) Granary Books (2014)
Glyph Notes: Commentary on A Book of Glyphs  (pdf of booklet included with the limited edition) Granary Books (2014)
Sharon Tate: A Life (2015)
Broken Glory: The Final Years of Robert F. Kennedy Arcade Publishing (2018) illustrated by Rick Veitch

Selected solo discography
Sanders' Truckstop 1969
Beer Cans on the Moon 1972
Yiddish-speaking socialists of the Lower East Side 1991
Songs in ancient Greek 1992
American Bard 1996
Thirsting for Peace 2005
Poems for New Orleans 2007
Surreal Housewives of Woodstock 2011 (never released, with Jules Shear)

Discography with the Fugs
See Fugs Discography

See also
List of peace activists
Poetry in Motion (1982)
 Woodstock Journal

Bibliography
Charters, Ann (ed.). The Portable Beat Reader. Penguin Books. New York. 1992.

References

External links

Guide to the Ed Sanders Papers at the University of Connecticut Archives & Special Collections
The Woodstock Journal
Photo Ed Sanders Performing With The Fugs, NYC, 1967 by Michael Maggid
Feature on Ed Sanders from Paste Magazine by Matt Fink
Audio recordings of Ed Sanders, from Maryland Institute College of Art's Decker Library, Internet Archive
Interview with Ed Sanders by Stephen McKiernan, from Binghamton University Libraries Center for the Study of the 1960s.

1939 births
Living people
Writers from Kansas City, Missouri
American environmentalists
American anti–Vietnam War activists
American tax resisters
Beat Generation writers
University of Missouri alumni
People from Woodstock, New York
American male poets
20th-century American poets
Reprise Records artists
Olufsen Records artists
21st-century American poets
Activists from New York (state)
The Fugs members
Yippies
American cannabis activists
PEN Oakland/Josephine Miles Literary Award winners
American Book Award winners
20th-century American male writers
21st-century American male writers